The 2011–12 Borussia Mönchengladbach season was the 111th season in the club's history. They played in the Bundesliga, the top tier of German football. It was the club's fourth consecutive season in this league having been promoted from the 2. Bundesliga in 2008.

They also took part in the DFB Pokal, Germany's top club knockout competition, where they reached the semifinals before being eliminated on penalties by fellow Bundesliga side Bayern Munich.

Review and events
Borussia opened the 2011–12 Bundesliga season with a 1–0 victory against Bayern Munich. This was their first victory against Bayern in Munich in 16 years. In April, masked supporters of 1. FC Köln attacked a bus with Mönchengladbach supporters on it. This was the second attack within a six-week period that Köln supporters attacked a bus with Mönchengladbach supporters on it.

Match results

Legend

Bundesliga

League table

Matches

DFB-Pokal

Player information

Roster and statistics

Transfers

In

Out
Roman Neustädter

Coaching and backroom staff

Kits

Sources

Borussia Monchengladbach
Borussia Mönchengladbach seasons